Krystelle Jones (born 30 April 1983) is a former Australian cricketer. She played two List A matches for Western Australia during the 2002–03 season of the Women's National Cricket League (WNCL).

References

External links
 
 

1983 births
Place of birth missing (living people)
Living people
Australian cricketers
Australian women cricketers
Western Australia women cricketers